Edward Murray Peters (born 21 May 1936) is an emeritus professor of University of Pennsylvania who specialized in the religious and political history of early Europe. 
He has done in-depth research regarding heresy, repression and the limits and treatment of intellectual inquiry in the low middle ages. He has also done deep research on historiography criticising, improving and reviewing the methods that traditional historiography has applied to the low medieval time period.

Publications
Europe and the Middle Ages, Pearson, 2003
Witchcraft in Europe, 400-1700: A Documentary History, University of Pennsylvania Press, 2000
The First Crusade: "The Chronicle of Fulcher of Chartres" and Other Source Materials, University of Pennsylvania Press, 1998
Torture, University of Pennsylvania Press, 1996
Inquisition, University of California Press, 1989
Heresy and Authority in Medieval Europe, University of California Press, 1980
The Magician, the Witch, and the Law, University of Pennsylvania Press, 1978
Christian Society and the Crusades, 1198-1229: Sources in Translation, including "The Capture of Damietta" by Oliver of Paderborn, University of Pennsylvania Press, 1971

References

1936 births
Living people
20th-century American historians
20th-century American male writers
American historians of religion
American medievalists
Historians from Pennsylvania
University of Pennsylvania faculty
University of Pennsylvania historian
21st-century American historians
21st-century American male writers
American male non-fiction writers